The White Heart discography, an American contemporary Christian music pop-rock band, consists of 11 studio albums. The band released its eponymous debut album in January 1982, after which followed 10 additional studio recordings and numerous official and unofficial compilations. Despite their standing as one of the premier CCM bands, White Heart never won a Dove Award. The band was inducted in the Christian Music Hall of Fame on November 6, 2010.

Although subject to numerous line-up changes, the core founding members were guitarist Billy Smiley and keyboardist/vocalist Mark Gersmehl. Longtime singer Rick Florian joined the band in 1986 after working as their roadie.

Discography

Studio albums

Live albums 

 Live at Six Flags (1986) Home Sweet Home Records

Compilation albums 

 White Heart Greatest Hits (1987) Home Sweet Home Records
 White Heart/Vital Signs (1989) Home Sweet Home Records
 Souvenirs (1990) Sparrow Records
 Quiet Storm: The Ballads (1993) Home Sweet Home Records
 Nothing But the Best: Rock Classics (1994) Star Song Records
 Nothing But the Best: Radio Classics (1994) Star Song Records
 Attack! Ten Explosive Hits (1995) Star Song Records
 White Heart: The Early Years (1996) Star Song Records
 Hits from the Heart (1999) BCI Music
 The Millennium Archives: Demos, Interviews, and Lost Songs (2000) Home Sweet Home Records
 Very Best of Whiteheart (2006) EMI Christian Music Group

References 

Rock music group discographies
Christian music discographies